Xiling Gorge is a gorge on the Yangtze River (Chang Jiang) in Hubei province, China. It is the easternmost and largest of the Three Gorges.

Geography
Xiling Gorge is located in Zigui County and Yiling District, in the west of Hubei province, from Xiangxi down to the western suburbs of Yichang. Xiangxi village is located in Zigui County, at the fall of the stream of the same name into the river, between Guizhou Town and Quyuan Town.

The area is named after Mt. Xiling, a peak at the eastern end of the gorge, and has been so named since at least the Three Kingdoms Period when it was recorded in the geographical treatise Shui Jing Zhu.

Xiling, which forms nearly half the length of the entire Three Gorges region, is actually a series of four different gorges: Precious Sword; Horse Lung and Ox Liver; Soundless Bell; and Shadow Play Gorges.

Three Gorges Dam
The Three Gorges Dam was constructed at  Sāndòupíng in the middle of the Xiling Gorge. Before the construction of the Three Gorges Dam and Gezhouba Dam, Xiling  was known for being the most dangerous of the three gorges to travel through, with frightening whirlpools and strong rapids.

References

External links 

 Xiling Gorge — photo gallery

Canyons and gorges of China
Landforms of Hubei
Yangtze River
Geography of Yichang